Far Eastern New Century (FENC), formerly known as Far Eastern Textile Limited (FETL; Chinese: 遠東紡織股份有限公司), is a Taiwanese conglomerate. Its main activity is the production and finishing of synthetic fibres and other textiles. It has factories in China, Taiwan and Southeast Asia.

In 2007 it was listed in the Forbes Global 2000 largest companies in the world, at #1560.

See also
 List of companies of Taiwan

References

External links
 Far Eastern New Century

Far Eastern Group
Textile companies of Taiwan
Companies based in Taipei